Adavi Dora is a 1995 Indian Telugu language film directed by K. Sadasivarao. The film stars Sobhan Babu, Nagma and Surabhi.

Cast
Sobhan Babu
Nagma
Surabhi
Brahmanandam

Soundtrack

Music was composed by Koti.
"Gali Vena Pellanta"
"Namo Narayana"
"Nandigama Bulloda"
"O Andhamaina Pilla"

References

External links

1995 films
Indian action films
Films set in forests
Films scored by Koti
1990s Telugu-language films
1995 action films